Leeming Senior High School  is a public co-educational high day school, located in the City of Melville on Aulberry Parade in the  suburb of Leeming, Western Australia.

History
The school was established in 1985 and caters for students from Year 7 to Year 12. 

The number of student enrolments has declined over the last five years. The school enrolled 1147 students in 2007, then 1074 in 2008, to 1018 in 2009, then fell to 882 in 2010 and to 809 in 2011. The fall in student numbers from 2010 is a result of the enrolment age changing for students entering high school in Western Australia.

The school received substantial funding as part of the "Becoming Asia Literate" program in 2010.

The school was ranked in the top 50 Western Australian schools by Australian Tertiary Admission Rank (ATAR) for 2015 by percentage.

Subjects offered
Leeming Senior High School operates a number of lower and upper school subject areas, including maths, science (physics, chemistry, biology, human biology, psychology), modern history, economics, geography, English and electives, including The Arts, Wood and Metal Work, and Information technology, Sports and others.

The school operates ATAR, general and certificate courses as well as providing information about university and TAFE pre-requisites.

The school offers two foreign languages: French and Japanese, including foreign exchange and excursion programmes.

Catchment area
Leeming's catchment area has been specified by the WA Department of Education to include the suburbs of Bateman, Bull Creek, Leeming. Leeming's feeder primary schools are Banksia Park, Bateman, Bull Creek, Leeming, Oberthur and West Leeming.

Its neighbouring government high schools are Rossmoyne to the north, Melville to the west, Lakeland to the south and Willetton to east.

Its neighbouring private high schools are All Saints College to the north, Corpus Christi and Kennedy Baptist College to the west.

See also

List of schools in the Perth metropolitan area

References

External links

Educational institutions established in 1985
1985 establishments in Australia
Public high schools in Perth, Western Australia